Earl of Brentford was a title that was created twice in Peerage of England. It was first created in 1644 when the Scottish soldier and diplomat Patrick Ruthven, 1st Earl of Forth, was made Earl of Brentford, in the County of Middlesex. He had already been created Lord Ruthven of Ettrick in 1639 and Earl of Forth in 1642, both in the Peerage of Scotland. He had no surviving male issue and the titles became extinct on his death in 1651. Lord Brentford was a great-grandson of William Ruthven, 1st Lord Ruthven (see Earl of Gowrie for earlier history of the family). His brother William Ruthven was the grandfather of Francis Ruthven, who was created a Baronet, of Redcastle, in 1666 (see Ruthven Baronets). The latter married Elizabeth, daughter of Thomas Ruthven, 1st Lord Ruthven of Freeland, great-grandson of William Ruthven, 2nd Lord Ruthven. Their daughter, Isabel (or Isobel), succeeded as 5th Lady Ruthven of Freeland in 1722 (see Lord Ruthven of Freeland for further history of this title).

The second creation of the earldom of Brentford came in 1689 in favour of Frederick Schomberg, who was also created Duke of Schomberg. For more information on this creation of the earldom, see Duke of Schomberg.

Earls of Brentford; First creation (1644)
Patrick Ruthven, 1st Earl of Brentford (d. 1651)
Alexander Ruthven, Lord Ruthven (d. between 1642 and 1649)
Patrick Ruthven
Patrick Ruthven, Lord Ruthven (1648–1650)

Earls of Brentford; Second creation (1689)
Duke of Schomberg

See also
Earl of Gowrie
Lord Ruthven of Freeland
Viscount Brentford
Baroness Brentford

References

Extinct earldoms in the Peerage of England

1644 establishments in England
Noble titles created in 1644
Noble titles created in 1689
Brentford